Nelson Angelo Tamsma Piquet Souto Maior (born July 25, 1985), also known as Nelson Piquet Junior or Nelsinho Piquet, is a Brazilian stock car racing driver and former Formula One and Formula E driver where he was champion in the 2014–15 season. He currently competes full-time in the Brazilian Stock Car Pro Series, driving the No. 33 Toyota Corolla E210 for Motul TMG Racing.

He also races a Rebellion R-One LMP1 in the FIA World Endurance Championship.

The son of three-time Formula One world champion Nelson Piquet, he was signed as test driver for Renault Formula One team for the 2007 season, and was promoted to the race team for 2008, before being dropped midway through the 2009 season. After losing his drive, it emerged that he had, under instruction from senior members of the team, crashed deliberately at the 2008 Singapore Grand Prix to help his teammate, Fernando Alonso, win the race. The resulting scandal became one of the most significant in motor sport history, and ultimately saw a permanent end to Piquet Junior's career in Formula 1.
Piquet also finished runner-up in the 2006 GP2 Series, fourth in the 2014 Global RallyCross Championship, and seventh in the 2012 NASCAR Truck Series.

Personal details
Piquet Jr., born in Heidelberg, West Germany, is the son of three-time Formula One world champion Nelson Piquet, one of Brazil's most successful F1 drivers.  Piquet's parents separated soon after he was born, and he lived in Monaco with his Dutch mother, Sylvia Tamsma, until he was eight years old. He then moved to live in Brazil with his father. "They kind of swapped me. My mother wanted me to get to know my father, she wanted me to know Brazil and the language, and she realized life in Brazil would be better for a child." Piquet has two sisters, Kelly and Julia, and four half-brothers, Geraldo, Laszlo, Pedro, and Marco. He lived in Brasília and attended the American School of Brasília until he was 16 years old, when he decided to pursue his racing career full-time.

Before Formula One
Piquet's racing career started in 1993 in Brazilian karting, where he would stay until 2001 when he moved to Formula Three Sudamericana. His father's wealth enabled him to race for his own team, a practice he continued until he left GP2 Series. He raced in part of the 2001 season there, staying for 2002 winning the championship with four races to go. In 2002 he also raced one race of Brazilian Formula Renault.

In 2003, Piquet moved to the United Kingdom where he joined the British Formula 3 Championship and formed the Piquet Sports team. He went on to finish the championship in 3rd place with six wins, five podiums and eight pole positions. A test with the Williams Formula One team followed.

In 2004, Piquet won the British Formula 3 Championship. He became the youngest driver to have ever won the championship at 19 years and 2 months.  He also did further running for Williams.

In 2005, Piquet took part in the A1 Grand Prix for A1 Team Brazil, winning both the Sprint and Main races at the first event of the season at Brands Hatch, as well as scoring a point for the fastest lap. He also drove for the HiTech/Piquet Sports in the GP2 Series, winning his first race at Spa-Francorchamps in Belgium, and tested for the BAR-Honda Formula One team.

In 2006, Piquet took second place in the championship behind British driver Lewis Hamilton in his second year of GP2.

Formula One (2007–2009)

2007
During the 2007 season he was the official test and reserve driver for the Renault Formula One team.

2008

The 2008 season saw Piquet promoted to the Renault Formula One race team to drive alongside returning double World Champion Fernando Alonso. It was reported that he gained preference for the seat over Heikki Kovalainen because Kovalainen was seen as a potential rival to Alonso, and such a challenge to Alonso could damage the team.

The first race of the 2008 season in Australia saw Piquet start 21st and damage his car in a collision on the opening lap, before ultimately retiring on lap 31. This was exactly the same result as his father achieved in his first race at the 1978 German Grand Prix. At the Malaysian Grand Prix he started from 13th on the grid and finished 11th. He started the Bahrain Grand Prix from 14th but retired with a gearbox problem after his second pit stop. Piquet qualified in 10th for the Spanish Grand Prix in Barcelona, taking part in the first top 10 qualifying session of his career. However, his race ended on lap seven after colliding with Sébastien Bourdais in an attempt to overtake. The Turkish Grand Prix saw him qualify 17th and finish the race 15th. His problems were further compounded with a pair of non-finishes, when he crashed out at Monaco after failing to get to grips with the damp conditions, and spun off while chasing teammate Alonso in Canada, before ultimately retiring on lap 42 with brake failure.

Piquet was under increasing pressure from his Renault team over the course of the 2008 season, and there was speculation he would lose his race seat if he did not improve. Renault did nothing to quell the rumours, publicly urging him to improve after the Turkish Grand Prix and suggesting after Monaco that he lacked confidence. Despite the pressure, Piquet scored his first points in F1 with a 7th-place finish at the 2008 French Grand Prix passing his twice-World Champion teammate Fernando Alonso in the last few laps. In the British Grand Prix at Silverstone, Piquet was at one point lying in fourth place, having passed his teammate who was on old tyres. Piquet aquaplaned and spun out on lap 36 along with several other top runners as the wet conditions reached their worst. A race later, however, at the German Grand Prix, he finished ahead of the Ferrari of Felipe Massa to claim second place to McLaren's Lewis Hamilton and his first podium finish. He had been the only driver on a one-stop strategy which, with the help of a safety car segment, gained him several positions. In the Japanese Grand Prix, he finished fourth.

2009
Despite rumours that he was on his way out, Renault decided to keep Piquet by signing him to a one-year contract. Alonso continued as his teammate, hoping to elevate Renault into title contention once again.

Piquet had a disappointing start to the 2009 season, failing to make past the first qualifying session in any of the first three races. His first race, in Australia, ended on lap 24 when he retired with brake failure. He had a better race in Malaysia the following week finishing 13th, two places and seven seconds behind his teammate Alonso after the race was cut short due to extreme weather. China was another disappointment, however, and after spinning several times and requiring two new nose cones for his car he eventually finished 16th and last, two laps down, in what team manager Flavio Briatore described as a "very, very bad race". He had a better race at Bahrain on his way to 10th making up one of the highest number of places behind Webber, whom he held off at the end of the race. In Spain he finished 12th.

Later, at the 2009 German Grand Prix, Piquet out-qualified his teammate for the first time. However, following the 2009 Hungarian Grand Prix, he still had not scored any points in the  season. On 3 August 2009 Piquet confirmed that he had been dropped by Renault. He hit out hard at his former manager and team boss Flavio Briatore calling him his 'executioner' and questioning Briatore's general Formula One knowledge. Piquet also said the Renault boss favoured teammate Fernando Alonso. Renault's test and reserve driver Romain Grosjean replaced Piquet for the rest of the season. Along with several other drivers, Piquet was linked to a drive with Ferrari as a replacement for the injured Felipe Massa, after stand-in Luca Badoer finished second-to-last at the European Grand Prix. However, Ferrari instead signed Giancarlo Fisichella who Piquet had replaced at Renault in 2008.

2009 FIA investigation: "Crashgate"

In August 2009, after Piquet left the Renault F1 team, allegations surfaced that Piquet had deliberately crashed his car at the 2008 Singapore Grand Prix, to benefit his teammate Fernando Alonso, who went on to win the race. At the time, Piquet characterized the crash as a simple mistake. Later, he recanted, making statements to the Fédération Internationale de l'Automobile (FIA) that it was deliberate, and that he had been asked by Renault team principal Flavio Briatore and engineer Pat Symonds to stage the crash. In return for his evidence, Piquet was granted blanket immunity by the FIA. On 4 September 2009, Renault F1 principals were charged with conspiracy and race rigging, and were called to face the FIA World Motor Sport Council in Paris on 21 September 2009.

On 11 September, Renault and Briatore stated they would initiate a criminal case against Piquet for making false allegations and blackmail. However, on 16 September, Renault announced they would not contest the charges, and that both Briatore and Symonds had left the team.

On 21 September, on conclusion of the FIA hearings, Piquet, who was 23 at the time of the 2008 Singapore GP, said "I bitterly regret my actions to follow the orders I was given...  My situation at Renault turned into a nightmare.  Having dreamed of being a Formula One driver and having worked so hard to get there, I found myself at the mercy of Mr Briatore.  His true character, which had previously only been known to those he had treated like this in the past, is now known. Mr Briatore was my manager as well as the team boss, he had my future in his hands but he cared nothing for it.  By the time of the Singapore GP he had isolated me and driven me to the lowest point I had ever reached in my life. Now that I am out of that situation I cannot believe that I agreed to the plan, but when it was put to me I felt that I was in no position to refuse." Renault accused Piquet of 'false allegations' and even produced an anonymous "Witness X" who supposedly provided first-hand details of the conspiracy planning, which backed up Pat Symonds' claim that the idea for the crash came from Piquet himself as a way to atone for poor performance and aid in his negotiations for a contract extension with the team.

However, in December 2010, the Piquets won a libel case against Renault. Renault apologised to Piquet for defaming him and paid substantial damages. The Piquets' lawyer said "They were both treated appallingly by Renault F1 when they dared to reveal the scandal to the governing body... F1 has been deprived of the best of Nelsinho and it is to [F1's] detriment that his talent is now being demonstrated elsewhere." Renault issued an apology in response to the High Court decision: "The team accepts that the allegations made by Nelson Piquet Jr. were not false. "It also accepts that Piquet Jr. and his father did not invent these allegations in order to blackmail the team."

On 15 October 2009, Felipe Massa was reported as saying he was "certain" Alonso was involved in the scandal, adding, "Without a doubt he knew it." Six weeks later, it was reported that Alonso turned down Massa's charity kart race invitation.

A few hours after the new Campos Meta team had confirmed Bruno Senna as one of its drivers for 2010, F1 chief executive Bernie Ecclestone said in the paddock of the new Yas Marina Circuit that he would like to see the sacked Piquet get another chance in F1 as Senna's teammate. Ecclestone said "It'd be good, wouldn't it, another good name. That's what's being talked about, actually."

On December 28, 2009, it was reported by Spanish website Motor21.com that Piquet had signed a three-year contract with Campos alongside Senna. However, this was later revealed by Motor21.com to have been a hoax in celebration of the Spanish Día de los Santos Innocentes festival. Piquet hinted that he had had talks with Force India. However, they opted to retain both Adrian Sutil and Vitantonio Liuzzi, so Piquet decided to move to NASCAR for 2010. Several months later, Piquet said that he had had talks with more than one F1 team to race again after the Crashgate controversy.

NASCAR (2010–2014, 2016)

Piquet told Brazilian Rede Globo that he would test a NASCAR Camping World Truck Series truck for Red Horse Racing from Rockingham Speedway in North Carolina on October 12, 2009. When asked whether the test could lead to a NASCAR drive next season, Piquet said it was not the plan.

However, he announced that he would race in NASCAR in 2010—albeit without specifying which series—during the following January. Piquet drove in the Camping World Truck Series with Red Horse Racing, and made his stock car debut in the ARCA RE/MAX Series at Daytona International Speedway driving the #6 Toyota for ARCA powerhouse Eddie Sharp Racing. In his first truck race, Piquet finished 6th, the first Brazilian driver to finish in the top ten in the series' history. Piquet then announced that he would compete in three races for Billy Ballew Motorsports driving the #15 truck. In August, he competed in the NASCAR Nationwide Series race at the Watkins Glen International road course and finished seventh in his first start in the series.

On December 13, 2010, Kevin Harvick, Inc. announced that Piquet would drive a third truck for the team for the full 2011 Truck series season, the #8 Chevrolet with Chris Carrier as crew chief. Piquet finished 10th in points and was a finalist for Most Popular Driver and runner-up to Joey Coulter for Rookie of the Year.

Piquet signed with Turner Motorsports for 2012 after KHI folded. That year he drove the No. 30 Chevrolet for the full season in the Camping World Truck Series, and drove part-time in the Nationwide Series.

Piquet scored his first win in a NASCAR-sanctioned series in March at Bristol Motor Speedway, winning his first-ever K&N Pro Series East start.

On June 23, 2012, Piquet scored his first win in NASCAR competition, winning the Nationwide Series Sargento 200 at Road America; he was the first Brazilian driver to win a NASCAR national touring series event.

On August 18, 2012, Piquet won his first race in the Camping World Truck Series at Michigan. On lap 56 of the race he spun out racing Kurt Busch after a restart. The team pitted under the caution and it allowed them to use fuel strategy later in the race to obtain their first win of the season. On September 29, 2012, Piquet won his second career Camping World Truck Series race at Las Vegas Motor Speedway.

In 2013, Piquet moved to full-time competition in the Nationwide Series, driving the No. 30 for Turner Scott Motorsports in a bid for Rookie of the Year. He also drove in selected Truck Series races for the team, and in the Truck Series finale at Homestead-Miami Speedway for NTS Motorsports.

Late in the 2013 season, Piquet was fined $10,000 by NASCAR and placed on probation until the end of the season for remarks described as "homophobic" made over social media.

In 2014, Piquet was hired by Randy Humphrey Racing to race the No. 77 Ford in the Sprint Cup Series' Cheez-It 355 at The Glen at Watkins Glen International, which would be his debut in the series.

Two years later, Piquet returned to the Nationwide Series, now known as the Xfinity Series, driving the No. 98 Ford for Biagi-DenBeste Racing at Mid-Ohio Sports Car Course.

Rallycross
Released by Turner Scott Motorsports due to a lack of sponsorship following the 2013 season, in April 2014 it was announced that Piquet would contest the 2014 Global RallyCross Championship with SH Racing, driving the No. 07 Ford Fiesta ST. He collected four podiums in nine races, and finished the season in fourth place in the championship standings.

Formula E (2014-2019)

China Racing/NEXTEV (2014–2017)
In August 2014, Piquet tested at Donington Park with Formula E team China Racing, and was hired by the team on August 21. In the first five races of the 2014–15 season, Piquet achieved podium finishes in Punta del Este, and Buenos Aires. Piquet achieved his first Formula E victory in Long Beach, and his second in Moscow which, coupled with his consistent results across the season, meant Piquet won the inaugural Formula E Championship by a solitary point from Sébastien Buemi.

Jaguar (2017–2019)

In 2017, Piquet joined the Panasonic Jaguar Racing after 2 frustrating seasons with NextEV.

Piquet was outmatched by his teammate Mitch Evans every ePrix in 2018-19 season, he only scored 1 point in that season. He left the Jaguar team after Sanya ePrix. He was replaced by Alex Lynn, for the remainder of the season.

Motorsports career results

Career summary

 Includes points scored by other Team Brazil drivers.
‡ Ineligible for championship points
* Season still in progress.

GP2 Series
(key) (Races in bold indicate pole position; races in italics indicate fastest lap)

A1 Grand Prix
(key) (Races in bold indicate pole position; races in italics indicate fastest lap)

24 Hours of Le Mans results

Formula One
(key)

NASCAR
(key) (Bold – Pole position awarded by time. Italics – Pole position earned by points standings. * – Most laps led.)

Sprint Cup Series

Xfinity Series

Camping World Truck Series

1 Ineligible for Camping World Truck championship points

K&N Pro Series East

 Ineligible for series points

ARCA Racing Series
(key) (Bold – Pole position awarded by qualifying time. Italics – Pole position earned by points standings or practice time. * – Most laps led.)

Stock Car Brasil

† Ineligible for championship points.

Complete Blancpain Sprint Series results

Complete Formula E results
(key) (Races in bold indicate pole position; races in italics indicate fastest lap)

† Driver did not finish the race, but was classified as he completed more than 90% of the race distance.

Complete Global RallyCross results

Supercar

Complete FIA World Endurance Championship results

References

External links

 
 
 

1985 births
Living people
Sportspeople from Brasília
Brazilian people of Dutch descent
Brazilian people of French descent
Brazilian expatriate sportspeople in England
British Formula Three Championship drivers
Formula 3 Sudamericana drivers
A1 Team Brazil drivers
GP2 Series drivers
Brazilian GP2 Series drivers
Brazilian Formula One drivers
Renault Formula One drivers
24 Hours of Le Mans drivers
Brazilian NASCAR drivers
ARCA Menards Series drivers
Porsche Supercup drivers
24 Hours of Daytona drivers
Rolex Sports Car Series drivers
International GT Open drivers
Stock Car Brasil drivers
Brazilian Formula E drivers
Formula E Champions
Indy Lights drivers
Global RallyCross Championship drivers
Brazilian expatriate sportspeople in Germany
X Games athletes
Nelson Piquet Jr.
Carlin racing drivers
Piquet GP drivers
Hitech Grand Prix drivers
A1 Grand Prix drivers
NIO 333 FE Team drivers
Rebellion Racing drivers
Jaguar Racing drivers
Teo Martín Motorsport drivers
FIA World Challenge for Endurance Drivers
Campos Racing drivers
ART Grand Prix drivers